In the context of systems science and systems philosophy, systemics is an initiative to study systems. It is an attempt at developing logical, mathematical, engineering and philosophical paradigms and frameworks in which physical, technological, biological, social, cognitive and metaphysical systems can be studied and modeled.

The term "systemics" was coined in the 1970s by Mario Bunge and others, as an alternative paradigm for research related to general systems theory and systems science.

See also

 Autopoiesis
 Cybernetics
 Dynamic system
 Integral theory
 Meta-knowledge
 Meta-system
 Meta-theory
 Relativism
 Reliabilism
 System engineering
 Scientific paradigm
 Socio-cognitive
 System dynamics
 Systemography
 Systems theory
 Triune continuum paradigm

References

Further reading
 Mario Bunge (1979), A world of systems. Dordrecht; Boston, Reidel.
 Charles François (1999), Systemics and Cybernetics in a Historical Perspective. in: Systems Research and Behavioral Science, Vol 16, pp. 203–219.
 Pouvreau David (2013). "Une histoire de la 'systémologie générale' de Ludwig von Bertalanffy - Généalogie, genèse, actualisation et postérité d'un projet herméneutique", Doctoral Thesis (1138 pages), Ecole des Hautes Etudes en Sciences Sociales (EHESS), Paris : http://tel.archives-ouvertes.fr/tel-00804157
 Frederic Vester (2008), The Art of interconnected thinking: Tools and concepts for a new approach to tackling complexity; Munich, MCB.

External links
 Journal of Systemics, Cybernetics and Informatics
 Computational Philosophy of Science – The MIT Press
 A Taste of Systemics by Béla H. Bánáthy

Systems theory
Systems science
pl:Teoria systemów